Ulysse Ellian (born 17 September 1988) is an Afghan-born Dutch lawyer and politician. He has been a member of the House of Representatives since the 2021 general election on behalf of the conservative-liberal People's Party for Freedom and Democracy (VVD). Ellian also served as a municipal councilor in Almere in the years 2018–21.

Early life and legal career 
He was born in 1988 in the Afghan capital Kabul as the son of Afshin Ellian, an Iranian law professor, poet, and critic of political Islam. His father had fled the Iranian regime and had met Ellian's mother in Afghanistan. His family came to the Netherlands in 1989, and Ellian grew up with his younger sister in Tilburg and Almere. He studied legal theory at the Vrije Universiteit Amsterdam and became a teacher and researcher specialized in private law at the university after his graduation in 2011. Ellian also started working as a lawyer, and he served as a staff member of the parliamentary inquiry into the failed high-speed rail service Fyra between 2013 and 2015.

Politics 
Ellian was elected to the Almere municipal council in the 2018 municipal elections as the VVD's second candidate after he had assisted the party's caucus in Almere since 2014. He succeeded Hilde van Garderen as the VVD's caucus leader when Van Garderen became an alderwoman two months after the March 2018 election. Ellian received security protection in 2019 after he had condemned the alleged role of the Iranian government in the murder of Mohammad-Reza Kolahi, who had been accused by Iran of having been involved in the Hafte Tir bombing in 1981 and lived in Almere under a false identity.

Criminal Naoufal F. filed a disciplinary complaint against Ellian in February 2020, because Ellian had said in an EenVandaag episode that F. had been responsible for Kolahi's murder on behalf of the Iranian government as Ridouan Taghi's right-hand man. F. had been convicted of organizing the murder but the case was on appeal. Ellian responded that he had not told any falsehoods, and he called the complaint "unacceptable intimidation of a politician". The Almere municipal council unanimously passed a motion supporting Ellian, and the disciplinary council declared the complaint unfounded in May.

House of Representatives 
Ellian ran for member of parliament in the March 2021 general election, being placed 22nd on the VVD's party list. He vacated his seat in the Almere municipal council eight days after the election. Ellian was elected to the House with 1,931 preference votes and was sworn in on 31 March. His focus is in on justice, law, constitutional matters, and antisemitism, and he is on the Committees for Defence, for European Affairs, for the Interior, and for Justice and Security as well as on the Credentials Committee. In April 2022, an amendment by Ellian passed the House to lower the threshold for required disclosure of political donations from €4,500 to €1,000. In October 2022, in reaction to comments by Minister for Legal Protection Franc Weerwind (D66) that prisoners with a life sentence would be released more often, Ellian posted on social media platform Twitter that Weerwind "would not rest before all criminals vote D66". He took back his words shortly after following criticism.

Ellian has worked on the government's approach to organized crime. He filed a motion to increase scrutiny of contact with the outside world from prisoners at Nieuw Vosseveld, where high-level criminals including Ridouan Taghi are housed, in order to prevent them from continuing their criminal activities. It was carried by the House. Another motion of his limited the number of lawyers prisoners at maximum security prisons can have to two for the same reason. Ellian revealed in an interview in late 2022 that he had been receiving protection since a few months without naming the nature of the threat.

Personal life 
Ellian is a resident of Almere. His partner, Lesley van Hilten, used to be an assistant of the CDA caucus in the Almere municipal council. She switched to the VVD in 2021 and became a municipal councilor two years later. They have a daughter, who was born in 2021, and Ellian also raises his partner's two sons.

References 

1988 births
21st-century Dutch lawyers
21st-century Dutch politicians
Afghan emigrants to the Netherlands
Dutch politicians of Iranian descent
Living people
Members of the House of Representatives (Netherlands)
Municipal councillors of Almere
People's Party for Freedom and Democracy politicians
Vrije Universiteit Amsterdam alumni